Two ships of the United States Navy have borne the name USS Rushmore, in honor of the Mount Rushmore National Memorial in the Black Hills of South Dakota.

United States Navy ship names